Taylor v. Taintor, 83 U.S. (16 Wall.) 366 (1872), was a United States Supreme Court case. It is commonly credited as having decided that a person to whom a suspect is remanded, such as a bail bondsman, has sweeping rights to recover the suspect.

Case overview

In 1866, sureties made an $8,000 cash bond for Edward McGuire in Connecticut, after he was charged with grand larceny. While awaiting trial in Connecticut, McGuire returned to his home in New York. Unknown to the bondsmen in Connecticut, McGuire was wanted in Maine for another felony. Upon request from the Governor of Maine later in 1866, the Governor of New York extradited McGuire to Maine, where he was convicted of burglary in 1867 and imprisoned for fifteen years. When McGuire failed to appear for trial in Connecticut in October 1866, the cash bond was forfeited. The Connecticut bondsmen sought relief from the forfeiture on grounds that they were not at fault in failing to secure McGuire's appearance, but rather that his nonappearance was the result of his extradition to Maine—an intervening "act of law" under the Extradition Clause of the U.S. Constitution.  The Supreme Court, by a vote of 4 to 3 (two justices recused themselves) held that the sureties were at fault and were not protected by the Extradition Clause. The sureties' "supineness and neglect" in failing to keep up with McGuire and to inform the New York authorities of the pending Connecticut case caused McGuire's nonappearance.

Commonly referenced paragraph

It is not the holding of the case, but a single paragraph in the middle of the majority opinion is commonly referred to:

References

External links

 

1873 in United States case law
United States Supreme Court cases
United States Supreme Court cases of the Chase Court